was a Japanese politician of the Liberal Democratic Party, a member of the House of Representatives in the Diet (national legislature), and a Minister of the Environment. A native of Shimizu, Shizuoka and graduate of Chuo University, he was elected to the first of his four terms in the city assembly of Shimizu in 1975 and to the first of his two terms in the assembly of Shizuoka Prefecture in 1991. He was elected to the House of Representatives for the first time in 1996 as an independent. He was affiliated to the openly revisionist organization Nippon Kaigi.

Mochizuki died in office at the age of 72 on 19 December 2019.

References

External links

1947 births
2019 deaths
People from Shizuoka (city)
Chuo University alumni
Members of the House of Representatives (Japan)
Liberal Democratic Party (Japan) politicians
Members of Nippon Kaigi
21st-century Japanese politicians
Environment ministers of Japan